Fevzi is the Turkish form of the Arabic name Fawzi (فوزيّ) meaning "triumph". It may refer to:

Given name

Fevzi Çakmak (1876–1950), Turkish field marshal
Fevzi Davletov (born 1972), Uzbekistani footballer
Fevzi Elmas (born 1983), Turkish footballer
Fevzi Tuncay (born 1977), Turkish footballer
Fevzi Zemzem (born 1941), Turkish footballer

Turkish masculine given names